The Tigray People's Liberation Front (TPLF), also called the Tigrayan People's Liberation Front, is a left-wing ethnic nationalist paramilitary group, a banned political party, and the former ruling party of Ethiopia.  It is designated as a terrorist organization by the Ethiopian government. It is widely known as Woyane or Wayane in older texts and Amharic publications.

The TPLF was established on 18 February 1975 in Dedebit, northwestern Tigray, according to official records. Within 16 years, it had grown from about a dozen men into the most powerful armed “liberation” movement in Ethiopia. It led a political coalition called the Ethiopian People's Revolutionary Democratic Front (EPRDF) from 1989 to 2018. It fought a 15-year-long war against the Derg regime, which was overthrown in 1991. Due largely to its warfighting capabilities, the TPLF was at the forefront of the defeat of the Derg.

The TPLF, with the support of the Eritrean People's Liberation Front (EPLF), overthrew the government of the People's Democratic Republic of Ethiopia (PDRE) on 28 May 1991 and established a new government, which remained in power until the TPLF was removed from federal government control in 2018.

On 18 January 2021, the National Election Board of Ethiopia terminated the party's registration, citing acts of violence and rebellion committed by the party's leadership against the Federal government in 2020, as well as a lack of representation. On 6 May 2021, the Ethiopian House of Peoples' Representatives formally approved a parliamentary resolution designating the TPLF as a terrorist organization.

In November 2022, the African Union in Pretoria, South Africa, brokered a deal between the two parties to end the war.

History

Origins
In a way, the TPLF is the product of the marginalization of Tigrayans within Ethiopia after Menelik II of Shewa became emperor in 1889. The Tigrayan traditional elite and peasantry had a strong regional identity and deeply resented the decline of Tigray. Memories of the armed revolt of 1942–43 (the "first [qädamay] wäyyanä") against the re-establishment of imperial rule after Italian occupation remained alive and provided an important reference for the new generations of educated Tigrayan nationalists.

At Haile Selassie I University (Addis Ababa University), from the early 1960s on, Tigrayan students created the Political Association of Tigrayans (PAT) in 1972 and the Tigrayan University Students' Association (TUSA). PAT developed into a radical nationalist group calling for the independence of Tigray, establishing the Tigray Liberation Front (TLF) in 1974. A Marxist trend emerged in the TUSA, favoring national self-determination for Tigray within a revolutionary, democratic Ethiopia.

Whereas the multinational left movements prioritized class struggle over the national self-determination of the Ethiopian nationalities, the Marxists of TUSA argued for self-determination as the launching pad for the ultimate socialist revolution, due to the existing inequalities among Ethiopian nationalities.

1974–1977
In February 1974, the Marxists within TUSA welcomed the Ethiopian Revolution but opposed the Derg (the military junta that ruled Ethiopia from 1974 to 1991), as they were convinced that it would neither lead a genuine socialist revolution nor correctly resolve the Ethiopian nationality question. Three days after the Derg took power, on 14 September 1974, seven leaders of this trend established the Association of Progressives of the Tigray Nation (Maḥbär Gäsgästi Bəḥer Təgray), also known as the Tigrayan National Organization (TNO): Alemseged Mengesha (nom de guerre: Haylu), Ammaha Tsehay (Abbay), Aregawi Berhe (Berhu), Embay Mesfin (Seyoum), Fentahun Zere'atsion (Gidey), Mulugeta Hagos (Asfeha), and Zeru Gesese (Agazi). The TNO was to prepare the ground for the future armed movement in Tigray.

It secretly approached both the Eritrean Liberation Front (ELF) and the Eritrean People's Liberation Front (EPLF) for support, but the ELF already had relations with the TLF. In November 1974, the EPLF agreed to train TNO members and allowed EPLF fighters from the Tigrayan community in Eritrea, among them Mehari Tekle (Mussie), to join the TPLF. The first batch of trainees was sent to the EPLF in January 1975.

On the night of 18 February 1975, eleven men, including Gesese Ayyele (Sehul), Gidey, Asfeha, Seyoum, Agazi, and Berhu, left Enda Selassie for Sehul's home area of Dedebit, where they established the TPLF (original name , Tägadlo Ḥarənnät Ḥəzbi Təgray, "The Popular Struggle for the Freedom of Tigray"). Welde Selassie Nega (Sebhat), Legese Zenawi (Meles), and others soon joined the original group, and, after the arrival of the trainees from Eritrea in June 1975, the TPLF had about 50 fighters. It then chose a formal leadership composed of Sehul (the chairman), Muse (the military commander), and the seven TNO founders. Berhu was appointed as political commissioner. Sehul played a crucial role in helping the nascent TPLF establish itself among the local peasantry.

Although some successful raids established its military credibility, the TPLF grew to only about 120 fighters in early 1976, but a rapidly expanding clandestine network of supporters in the towns and a support base among the peasants provided vital supplies and intelligence. On 18 February 1976, a fighters' conference elected new leadership: Berhu (Chairman), Muse (Military Committee), Abbay (Political Committee), Agazi (Socio-Economic Committee), Seyoum (Foreign Relations), Gidey, and Sebhat. Meles became head of the political cadre school.

The first three years of its existence were marked by a constant struggle for survival, unstable cooperation with the Eritrean forces, and power struggles against the other Tigrayan fronts: in 1975, the TPLF liquidated the TLF; in 1976–78, it fought back the Ethiopian Democratic Union (EDU) in Shire; and in 1978, it fought the Ethiopian People's Revolutionary Party (EPRP) in eastern Tigray. Besides this, the Front had to suffer heavy losses due to the Derg's offensives in the region.

Although the TPLF, the ELF, and the EPLF cooperated during the Derg offensives of 1976 and 1978 in Tigray and Eritrea, no stable alliance was formed. The ELF resented the liquidation of the TLF and viewed relations between the EPLF and the TPLF as a serious threat. Since 1977, the ELF and the TPLF have had conflicts over the issue of Eritrean settlers in western Tigray, who were organized under the ELF and rejected the TPLF's land reform.

Relations with the EPLF also did not develop smoothly. Its material support was much less than the TPLF expected. Politically, the EPLF preferred the multi-national EPRP to the ethno-regionalist TPLF with its then-separatist agenda.

1978–1990
Following the Derg's victory in the Ogaden War in February 1978, Mengistu Haile Mariam's new alliance with the Soviets, and the revolutionary growth of his armed forces, the TPLF's momentum seemed to slow.

In February 1979, the TPLF held its first regular congress. It declared its struggle to be the second wäyyanä (kalay wäyyanä) and changed its Tigrinya name to Həzbawi Wäyyanä Harənnätä Təgray. It adopted a new political program calling for self-determination within a democratic Ethiopia, with independence as an option only if unity proved to be impossible.
Winning and maintaining the support of the local population was at the heart of the TPLF’s strategy during the 1970s and 1980s. TPLF leaders understood that the goodwill of the population would sustain their movement and ultimately propel it to victory over the Derg. Consequently, any fighter caught abusing locals was punished or even executed by TPLF authorities. As a result, local support for the TPLF was consistent and invaluable. The local population shared food and resources with the fighters, provided them with safe havens, and most critically, they supplied the TPLF with timely intelligence.

In retrospect, it is apparent that the 1978–1985 period further strengthened the TPLF. The Derg's increasingly alienating intervention, the Front's handling of the famine and of the refugee problems, as well as the foreign connections it built through its mission in Khartoum, all enabled the movement to mobilize and better equip more fighters and prepare for a change from guerrilla to frontal battles. Also, in the mid-1980s, developments within the TPLF led to a conceptual shift from a struggle for the liberation of Tigray to that of all of Ethiopia.

They established their headquarters in caves in Addi Geza'iti, some 50 kilometers west of Mekelle. The Ethiopian People's Democratic Movement (EPDM), a TPLF-loyal splinter group from the EPRP, used caves in Melfa (Dogu'a Tembien).

The TPLF succeeded in turning the catastrophic famine of 1984–85 to its overall advantage. In early 1985, it organized a march of over 200,000 famine victims from Tigray to Sudan to draw international attention to the plight of Tigray. Its humanitarian branch, the Relief Society of Tigray (REST), established in 1978, received large amounts of international humanitarian aid for famine victims and small-scale development projects in liberated Tigray.

In 1984–1985, the TPLF redirected Western aid intended for starving civilians in order to purchase weapons.

In July 1985, a congress of a few hundred selected cadres established the Marxist–Leninist League of Tigray (MLLT). The MLLT was conceived to be the nucleus of the future Marxist-Leninist vanguard party for the whole of Ethiopia. The MLLT invited the genuine revolutionaries within the ranks of the Derg regime, which was then busy organizing its own communist party, the Ethiopian Workers' Party, to join it.

After the congress, the TPLF and its mass organizations were ruthlessly brought under the control of the MLLT, and dissenting cadres, among them TPLF co-founders Gidey and Berhu, were purged.

In December 1988, the TPLF and EPDM founded the Ethiopian People's Revolutionary Democratic Front (EPRDF) as the nucleus of the envisaged United Democratic Front. In spring 1989, first the MLLT and then the TPLF held a congress. Abbay was elected chairman of both, but towards the end of 1989, Meles became the chairman of both organizations. In May 1989, the EPDM established the Ethiopian Marxist-Leninist Force (EMLF).

In July 1989, MLLT and EMLF created the Union of Ethiopian Proletarian Organizations. In April 1990, the TPLF formed the Ethiopian Democratic Officers Movement from politically re-educated captured Ethiopian officers to undercut the Free Officers Movement, formed in 1987 by exiled Ethiopian officers in opposition to the Derg. In May 1990, Oromo members of the EPDM and politically re-educated Oromo prisoners of war founded the Oromo Peoples' Democratic Organization (OPDO) to deny the Oromo Liberation Front's claim to be the exclusive representative of the Ethiopian Oromo.

In November 1990, an Oromo Marxist-Leninist Movement was established within the OPDO. Also in 1990, the TPLF created the Afar Democratic Union to undercut the Afar movements. Before 1985, it had already helped establish liberation fronts in Gambella and Benshangul.

In early 1988, the EPLF and the TPLF went on the offensive. The developing situation in both Eritrea and Tigray, but also the shifting international context after the demise of the Soviet bloc, induced the TPLF and EPLF to put their differences aside and resume military cooperation. In 1989, the EPRDF formed a shadow government in Ethiopia to administer the liberated areas under its control.

1991–2018

In February 1991, the EPRDF launched its offensive against the governing regime, assisted by a large EPLF contingent. On 28 May 1991, the EPRDF entered Addis Ababa, the capital of Ethiopia, and assumed control of the country. In July 1991, the EPRDF established the Transitional Government of Ethiopia. In May 1991, the TPLF had 80,000 fighters, the EPDM had 8,000, and the OPDO had 2,000. The total number of TPLF members was well beyond 100,000.

Reacting to the international political context after the demise of communism, the EPRDF and TPLF dropped all Marxist references in their political discourse and adopted a program of change based on multi-party politics, constitutional democracy, ethno-linguistic federalization, and a mixed economy.

Under the EPRDF, Ethiopia was governed as an ethnically federal, dominant-party state. Meles Zenawi, a member of the TPLF, served as Prime Minister until his death in 2012. During EPRDF rule, Ethiopia retained authoritarianism and shifted from a one-party state to a dominant-party state.

In opposition: 2018–2020
 
In November 2019, Prime Minister Abiy Ahmed and the chairman of the Ethiopian People's Revolutionary Democratic Front unified the constituent parties of the coalition into a new Prosperity Party. The TPLF viewed this merger as illegal and did not participate in the merger.

From the start of January 2020, the TPLF was involved in activities that were criticized by the federal government. In June 2020, the Ethiopian parliament—to which the TPLF was a party—voted to postpone the 2021 Ethiopian General Election, which was originally scheduled to occur in 2020. The TPLF defied the parliamentary vote and held regional elections anyway.

The 2020 Tigray regional election was held on 9 September 2020. It was open to international observers, boycotted by Arena Tigray and the Tigray Democratic Party and 2.7 million people participated in the election. Prime Minister Ahmed stated that the federal government would not recognize the results of the election and banned foreign journalists from traveling to Tigray to document the elections.

2020–2021: Tigray War

In November 2020, a civil conflict broke out between the TPLF and the Ethiopian National Defense Force (ENDF) when the TPLF attacked the ENDF Northern Command headquarters in what TPLF spokesman Getachew Reda called a "preemptive operation". In November 2020, Prime Minister Abiy Ahmed declared victory over the TPLF. Other sources implied that the Ethiopian National Defense Force (ENDF) was actually in control of only about 70% of the Tigray region. Many TPLF members joined the Tigray Defense Forces (TDF). The conflict caused a humanitarian crisis in many parts of the country, and estimates of the number of deaths are in the thousands. As of March 2021, approximately 2 million people had been displaced by the crisis, but the full extent of the crisis was unknown. The TPLF has accused the ENDF and Eritrean forces of war crimes, but it is difficult to independently verify these claims because of the media blackout that has been imposed by the Federal Government under Abiy. On 23 March 2021, the Prime Minister acknowledged for the first time that Eritrean military forces had been in the Tigray region, after international pressure. In July 2021, after the Ethiopian government declared a unilateral ceasefire and withdrew from much of the Tigray Region, the TDF invaded the neighboring Afar and Amhara regions. The ENDF then launched its own counteroffensive, and by December 2021, it had recaptured those regions. As of March 2022, the war had ground to a virtual stalemate.

The TPLF has been accused of forcing enlistment into the TDF, including that of minors. According to multiple witnesses and Tigrayan administrative officials, each household in Tigray was required to enlist one family member in the TDF, and those who refused to comply were arrested and imprisoned, including parents of minors who did not wish to enlist.

Election results
Elections from 1995 to 2015 were conducted under the Ethiopian People's Revolutionary Democratic Front banner.

Linkage with terrorism
The United States government lifted the TPLF's designation as a Tier III terrorist group when the group came to power in 1991. However, an analysis by the Terrorism Research and Analysis Consortium (TRAC) also listed them as a terrorist group dating back to 1976. According to the TRAC:

In 2021, the federal government of Ethiopia approved a parliamentary resolution designating the TPLF as a terrorist organization. Under Article 23, "this decision will become applicable to organizations and individuals who collaborate, have links with or relate to the ideas and actions of the designated terrorist organizations and others who have engaged in similar activities." However, individuals or organizations “engaged in humanitarian activities” are exempt, as per Ethiopian anti-terrorism proclamation 1176/2020.

References

 
Organizations designated as terrorist
1975 establishments in Ethiopia
Banned socialist parties
Political parties established in 1975
Political parties in Ethiopia
Rebel groups in Ethiopia
Rebel groups that actively control territory
Tigray Region